"Saturday (Oooh! Ooooh!)" is the third official single from Ludacris's second album, Word of Mouf. The song was written by R. Murray, R. Wade, P. Brown and C. Bridges and was produced by Organized Noize.

The song debuted on the Billboard Hot 100 at number 95 on February 16, 2002, reached the top 40 at number 37 on April 6, 2002, and peaked at number 22 on April 20.

Charts

Weekly charts

Year-end charts

Release history

References

External links

2001 songs
2002 singles
Ludacris songs
Def Jam Recordings singles
Songs written by Ludacris